32 Battalion (sometimes nicknamed Buffalo Battalion, Three-two battalion or  for The Terrible Ones) was a light infantry battalion of the South African Army founded in 1975, composed of black and white commissioned and enlisted personnel. It was disbanded on 26 March 1993.

History

Military refugees
After the victory of the Movimento Popular de Libertação de Angola (MPLA) in the Angolan War of Independence in 1975, many troops of its main rival, the Frente Nacional de Libertação de Angola (National Liberation Front of Angola, FNLA), found refuge in the then South African-controlled South West Africa.

Formation of Bravo Group
From these troops, Colonel Jan Breytenbach together with Commandant Sybie van der Spuy formed a unit that was initially known as Bravo Group but later renamed 32 Battalion. Initially, Bravo Group consisted of two infantry companies, a mortar platoon, an anti-tank section and a machine gun platoon, but 32 Battalion was finally expanded to seven infantry companies, a reconnaissance wing, and a support company consisting of 81 mm mortar, anti-tank and machine gun sections.

Redeployed as the SADF
Unlike other South African Defence Forces (SADF) units, 32 Battalion was mainly deployed in southern Angola, acting as a buffer between the SADF's regular forces and its enemies. The unit was also used to assist the anti-communist movement of the National Union for the Total Independence of Angola (UNITA). Although it was mainly used as a counter-insurgency force it was eventually also used as a semi-conventional force, especially during the later phases of the war – particularly at the Battle of Cuito Cuanavale.

The battalion consisted of around 700 riflemen and NCOs (non-commissioned officers) (mostly Angolan nationals associated with the former FNLA or the Portuguese Army) and mainly South African officers, although commissioned military personnel from countries such as Australia, Rhodesia, Portugal and the United States were active with the battalion, especially in its early stages.  As time progressed a number of SNCOs (senior non-commissioned officers – sergeants and above), distinguished themselves and were commissioned.

At the end of its era in Namibia, the unit had developed into a conventional battle group. Apart from the infantry companies and the recce company, the battalion was strengthened by a battery of  mortars, a squadron of Ratel ZT-3 and  tank destroyers and a troop of  anti-aircraft guns mounted on Buffel infantry vehicles. 

Although the main bulk of the battalion was based at Buffalo on the banks of the Okavango River, the HQ was in Rundu,  to the west.

Namibian independence
After Namibian independence in 1989-1990, the unit was withdrawn to South Africa where it was further used in a counter-insurgency role on South Africa's borders and later also in townships.

Phola Park Incident
On 8 April 1992 members of 32 Battalion were involved in an incident in Phola Park, Gauteng where members of the public were shot and killed. The incident drew widespread criticism, specifically from the African National Congress (ANC) and prompted the Minister of Defence to request an investigation by the Goldstone Commission.

Disbandment
As one of the results of the negotiations between the National Party and the ANC, the unit was disbanded in March 1993. After the battalion was disbanded, the remaining members of the unit were transferred to other SADF-units such as the Parachute and Mechanised Battalions as well as the Recces. It was also decided to reactivate 2-SAI at Pomfret which enabled about a quarter of the troops to return to Pomfret as members of the new 2-SAI. However, when 2-SAI was moved to Zeerust in 1999, many of them decided to rather stay behind at Pomfret and handed in their resignations.  In 2008 there still remained about a quarter of the original 1,000 three-two families at Pomfret, eking out mainly a hand-to-mouth existence.

Many members of the unit later helped to found or joined private military companies such as Executive Outcomes and Sandline International, which fought on the side of the Angolan government against UNITA. Executive Outcomes was utilized by the Sierra Leonean government to repel RUF forces between March 1995 and March 1997 during the Sierra Leone Civil War.

Equatorial Guinea coup
Some of the participants in the alleged 2004 Equatorial Guinea coup d'état attempt were former members of 32 Battalion. Because they were arrested in Zimbabwe, it is not clear whether any of those arrested had full knowledge of their final destination or the alleged plan to carry out a coup d'état.

Decorations 
The battalion was one of the most decorated units during the South African Border War, with a total of 13 Honoris Crux medals for bravery awarded to its members, second only to the South African Special Forces Brigade, whose members were awarded 46 Honoris Crux medals during the same period.

 Lieutenant Connie van Wyk
 Sergeant Danny Roxo
 Warrant Officer 2 Willy Ward
 Major Eddie Viljoen
 Lance Corporal Feliciano Costa
 Corporal Eduardo João
 Second Lieutenant Petrus Nel
 Corporal Victor Dracula
 Rifleman Bernardo Domingos
 Major Hannes Nortmann
 Sergeant Rihan Rupping
 Captain Petrus van Zyl – Operation Modular
 Lieutenant Tobias de Vos – Operation Modular

In fiction
In the film Blood Diamond, Leonardo DiCaprio's Rhodesian character "Danny Archer" was a former member of 32 Battalion.

In the film Elysium, Sharlto Copley's character "Kruger" was an ex-member of 32 Battalion.

Roll of Honour

Leadership

Insignia

Dress Insignia

See also

 32 Battalion (book) (by Piet Nortje, 2004)
 South African Special Forces Brigade ("Recces")
 List of operations of the South African Border War
 Operation Savannah

Notes

References

External links
 Official Website of the 32Bn VA
 "The Terrible Ones"
 South African Special Forces League
 SA Roll of Honour Database
 To the Bush and Back by Nico van der Walt

Expatriate military units and formations
Infantry battalions of South Africa
Military units and formations disestablished in 1993
Military units and formations established in 1975
Military units and formations of South Africa in the Border War
Military units and formations of the Cold War
Organisations associated with apartheid